José Julián Sacramento Garza (born 21 August 1956) is a Mexican politician affiliated with the PAN. He served as Deputy of the LIX Legislature of the Mexican Congress representing Tamaulipas. He also served as Senator during the LX and LXI Legislatures and was nominated as candidate for Governor of Tamaulipas.

References

1956 births
Living people
People from Matamoros, Tamaulipas
Members of the Senate of the Republic (Mexico)
Members of the Chamber of Deputies (Mexico)
National Action Party (Mexico) politicians
21st-century Mexican politicians
Politicians from Tamaulipas
Autonomous University of Nuevo León alumni